This is a list of refrigerants, sorted by their ASHRAE-designated numbers, commonly known as R numbers.  Many modern refrigerants are man-made halogenated gases, especially fluorinated gases and chlorinated gases, that are frequently referred to as Freon (a registered trademark of Chemours).   The R number of a chemical refrigerant is assigned systematically according to molecular structure. First ASHRAE digit is the number of carbon atoms minus 1 (C-1); the second digit is the number of hydrogen atoms plus 1 (H+1); the third digit is the number of fluorine atoms; any remaining spaces are chlorine atoms. Eg.: R-22 aka R-022, which is chlorodifluoromethane. C=1 i.e. 1-1=0; H=1 i.e. 1+1=2; F=2 i.e 2; 1 remaining space  1=Cl. A "B" number means that one of the chlorine atoms is replaced by bromine (Br). This formula does not work with zeotropic or azeotropic blends.

The table is sortable by each of the following refrigerant properties (scroll right or reduce magnification to view more properties):   
 Type/prefix  (see legends)
 ASHRAE number
 IUPAC chemical name
 molecular formula
 CAS registry number / blend name
 Atmospheric lifetime in years
 Semi-empirical ozone depletion potential
 Net global warming potential over a 100-year time horizon
 Occupational exposure limit/permissible exposure limit in parts per million (volume per volume) over a time-weighted average (TWA) concentration for a normal eight-hour work day and a 40-hour work week
 ASHRAE 34 safety group in toxicity & flammability (in air @ 60 °C, 101.3 kPa) classing (see legends)
 Refrigerant concentration limit / immediately dangerous to life or health in parts per million (volume per volume) and grams per cubic meter
 Molecular mass in atomic mass units
 Normal boiling point (or bubble & dew points for the zeotrope(400)-series), or normal boiling point and azeotropic temperature for the azeotrope(500)-series) at 101,325 Pa (1 atmosphere) in degrees Celsius
 Critical temperature in degrees Celsius
 Absolute critical pressure in kilopascals

Since over 100,000 refrigerant blends are possible, this list should only have notable refrigerants and refrigerant blends.

List

Type and flammability 

Compounds used as refrigerants may be described using either the appropriate prefix above or with the prefixes "R-" or "Refrigerant." Thus, CFC-12 may also be written as R-12 or Refrigerant 12.An alkene, olefin, or olefine is an unsaturated compound containing at least one carbon-carbon double bond.

 Educated Estimates

See also
Haloalkane

References

Notes

Refrigerants
Chemical compounds